Anton Andrianovich Batugin (born  in Kemerovo) is a Russian curler and curling coach.

As a coach of Russian wheelchair curling team he participated in 2014 and 2018 Winter Paralympics. In 2018 the Russian National team won the tournament in Kisakallio.

In 2020 the Russian National team beat Canada for the gold medal at the World Wheelchair Curling Championship.

Teams

Record as a coach of national teams

References

External links

Батугин Антон Андрианович - Sportbox

Living people
1980 births
Sportspeople from Kemerovo
Russian male curlers
Russian curling coaches
Moscow State Mining University alumni